Stephen Wayne Anderson (July 8, 1953 – January 29, 2002) was an American contract killer and serial killer who was executed at California's San Quentin State Prison by lethal injection in 2002 for the murder of Elizabeth Lyman. He was either known to have killed or admitted to the killings of at least eight other people, including a fellow inmate and at least seven contract killings.

Early life
Stephen Wayne Anderson was born on July 8, 1953, the older of two boys born to an alcoholic father with a violent temper and an emotionally abusive mother who kicked both Stephen and his brother out of the home when he was 14. They began living with friends and relatives following the ban.

Crimes
Anderson committed his first violent crime in 1971, when he burglarized a school in Farmington, New Mexico. During the robbery, he threatened two police officers. He was convicted of burglary and sentenced to one to five years in prison. He was paroled on that count in 1975, but continued to serve a sentence of 10 to 50 years on multiple aggravated burglary convictions. Anderson was sent out of state to the Utah State Prison. While he was there, he killed a fellow inmate named Blundell on August 24, 1977. He also assaulted another inmate, and assaulted a correctional officer. Anderson admitted to six other contract killings in Las Vegas, Nevada that happened prior to the crime for which he received a death sentence. On November 24, 1979, he escaped from prison, after which he worked for narcotics traffickers and committed at least one murder in the eastern mountains of Salt Lake County, Utah.

On May 26, 1980, Anderson, then 26, burglarized the Bloomington, California house of 81-year-old Elizabeth Lyman, a retired piano teacher. In the middle of the night, Anderson cut Lyman's telephone line with a knife, and broke into her home by removing a glass pane from her French doors. He checked the house for occupants room by room. When he entered Lyman's bedroom, she awoke and screamed. Anderson shot her in the face from close range with a .45 caliber handgun, fatally wounding her. He covered her body with a blanket, recovered the expelled casing from the hollow-point bullet that killed her, and ransacked her house for money. He found less than $100.

Anderson then prepared himself a meal in Lyman's kitchen. A suspicious next door neighbor called the sheriff's department. As he was eating and watching television, sheriff's deputies responded to the call and arrested him. He admitted to the murder. Anderson later told the detectives that "I was born and trained to be a killer. I always wanted to be a killer."

Trial and execution
On July 24, 1981, Anderson was convicted and sentenced to death. The prosecution pointed to his violent history, both in and out of prison, as evidence that he was too dangerous to be kept alive. 

On January 29, 2002, Anderson was executed by lethal injection at San Quentin State Prison. He was pronounced dead at 12:30 a.m. PT. Andersons' last meal consisted of two grilled cheese sandwiches with radishes, one pint of cottage cheese, a hominy/corn mixture, one slice of peach pie, and one pint of chocolate chip ice cream. He had no last words.

See also
 Capital punishment in California
 Capital punishment in the United States
 List of people executed in California
 List of people executed in the United States in 2002
 List of serial killers in the United States

References

1953 births
1980 murders in the United States
2002 deaths
21st-century executions by California
21st-century executions of American people
Contract killers
Executed American serial killers
Executed people from Utah
Male serial killers
People convicted of murder by California
People executed by California by lethal injection